The Rochester Lancers (formerly known as Rochester River Dogz FC) are an American soccer team based in Rochester, New York. Founded as the Rochester River Dogz in 2015, the team rebranded as the Rochester Lancers in April 2017. The team play its home games at the Aquinas Institute's Wegmans Stadium.

Their name comes from the original Lancers who played from 1967 until 1980 as well as the indoor team that began play in 2011.

About 
The Rochester River Dogz Football Club were accepted to play in the National Premier Soccer League (NPSL) in November 2015. The River Dogz won their inaugural game 1–0 against FC Buffalo. The River Dogz finished the regular season with a 3–4–3 record. The River Dogz were owned by Marc Mandell and Nick Mojsovski. In 2017 Doug Miller joined the group and convinced Salvatore "SoccerSam" Fantauzzo to be part owner and let the group use the Rochester Lancers name and logo. The Lancers celebrated their 50th year in 2017 with the return of the outdoor Lancers in the National Premier Soccer League (NPSL) and the new Lady Lancers in the United Women's Soccer League (UWS). The 2017 both Lancers outdoor teams played at the Charlie Schiano Field at The Aquinas Institute. Due to renovations at Aquinas the teams moved to the Marina Auto Stadium for the 2018 season. The team was formed in the NASL in 1967. The team played from 1967 to 1980. In 2009 SoccerSam purchased the Lancers name and logo for his soccer collection and to pay tribute to the Legends and pioneers of American soccer. In 2011, SoccerSam introduced the indoor Lancers as part of the MISL which became the MASL. Lancers indoor soccer brought back many familiar Rochester soccer favorites, including Doug Miller who was the team's leading scorer for the first three seasons and then became the head coach in the final year. After the 2015 season the team went into hiatus due to issues with the NYS insurance fund.

Stadium 
The Lancers' home field is Wegmans Stadium at the Aquinas Institute, although they played in Marina Auto Stadium for the 2018 season.

Year-by-year

Players

2017 Roster

2020 Roster 

Note: Roster up-to-date .

References

External links
 

 
2015 establishments in New York (state)
Association football clubs established in 2015
Men's soccer clubs in New York (state)
National Premier Soccer League teams
Lancers